Vali Aydin oglu Gasimov (also spelled Veli Aydin oglu Kasumov; ; born 4 October 1968) is an Azerbaijani football coach and a former player who played as a striker.

Career

Club
Born in Kirovabad, Azerbaijan Soviet Socialist Republic, Soviet Union, Gasimov started playing for FC Mayak Kharkov and FC Metallist Kharkov. In 1992, he switched to FC Spartak Moscow but, unsettled, finished the season at neighbours FC Dynamo, being eventually crowned the first division's top scorer at 16 goals.

Gasimov was bought by Spain's Real Betis in January 1993, but would appear very irregularly in his two 1/2 seasons at the Andalusia side. After just three La Liga appearances in his final season, he finished his stint in the country with two clubs (and two relegations), Albacete Balompié and Écija Balompié (the latter in the second division, where he failed to score).

In summer 1997, Gasimov moved to Portugal with Vitória de Setúbal. He suffered a back injury which forced him to rest for a significant period of his debut season, but still netted 11 times in 24 matches. After a second campaign he retired still in the country, with Imortal DC in Algarve.

International
Gasimov played for the Soviet Union under-16 national team in 1985, helping the team to win the 1985 UEFA European Under-16 Championship.

Gasimov won 14 caps for Azerbaijan during four years, making his debut on 19 April 1994 in a 0–5 friendly loss to Malta.

Managerial
After retiring, Gasimov coached his national team's under-19 side.

On 14 September 2016, Gasimov was sacked as manager of Neftchi Baku.

Club statistics

Club

International

Updated 26 October 2016

Honours

Club
Neftchi Baku
USSR Federation Cup runner-up: 1988

Spartak Moscow
Soviet Cup: 1991–92

Country
Soviet Union U16
UEFA European Under-16 Championship: 1985

Individual
Russian Premier League top scorer: 1992
Best 33 players of the Russia Top League season: No. 1 — 1992

References

External links
 
 
 

1968 births
Living people
Sportspeople from Ganja, Azerbaijan
Azerbaijani footballers
Association football forwards
FC Olympik Kharkiv players
FC Metalist Kharkiv players
Russian Premier League players
FC Spartak Moscow players
FC Dynamo Moscow players
Soviet Top League players
La Liga players
Segunda División players
Real Betis players
Albacete Balompié players
Écija Balompié players
Primeira Liga players
Liga Portugal 2 players
Vitória F.C. players
Imortal D.C. players
Azerbaijan international footballers
Azerbaijani expatriate footballers
Azerbaijani football managers
Expatriate footballers in Russia
Expatriate footballers in Spain
Azerbaijani expatriate sportspeople in Spain
Expatriate footballers in Portugal
Azerbaijani expatriate sportspeople in Portugal
Neftçi PFK players